Oenopota kagana is an extinct species of sea snail, a marine gastropod mollusk in the family Mangeliidae.

Description
The length of the shell attains 21 mm.

Distribution
This extinct marine species was found in Pleistocene strata from Ishikawa, Japan.

References

  Yokoyama, Tertiary fossils from various localities in Japan; Palaeontological Society of Japan, Special papers # 5, 1959

External links
 Takeo Ichikawa, Catalogue of type and illustrated specimens in the department of historical geology and palaeontology of the University Museum~ University of Tokyo

kagana
Gastropods described in 1927